Unlock the Gates is the fourth and last album by the rock band Gypsy. Keyboardist James Walsh continued the band in various incarnations as The James Walsh Gypsy Band. The horn section is from the band Chicago.

Track listing
All songs by Enrico Rosenbaum except as noted.

 "Is That News?" (Rosenbaum, Johnson) – 3:15
 "Make Peace With Jesus" (Rosenbaum, Walsh) – 3:15
 "One Step Away" (Walsh)  – 3:11
 "Bad Whore (The Machine)"  – 2:48
 "Unlock the Gates"  – 3:42
 "Join In"  – 2:46
 "Need You Baby" – 3:05
 "Smooth Operator" – 3:20
 "Don't Get Mad (Get Even)" – 3:14
 "Precious One" (Johnson) – 4:19

Personnel
Enrico Rosenbaum - guitar, vocals
James Walsh - keyboards, vocals
James Johnson - guitar, vocals
Bill Lordan - drums
Randall Cates - bass, vocals
Walter Parazaider - saxophone
James Pankow - trombone
Lee Loughnane - trumpet

Production notes
Produced by Jack Richardson, Jim Mason
Engineered by Brian Christian

Charts
Single

References

External links
 Gypsy Tribute site

1973 albums
RCA Victor albums
Gypsy (band) albums
Albums produced by Jack Richardson (record producer)